(born November 21, 1949) is a Japanese weightlifter and Olympic medalist. He won a bronze medal at the 1976 Summer Olympics in Montreal, Quebec, Canada.

References 

1949 births
Living people
Olympic weightlifters of Japan
Weightlifters at the 1976 Summer Olympics
Olympic bronze medalists for Japan
Olympic medalists in weightlifting
Asian Games medalists in weightlifting
Weightlifters at the 1974 Asian Games
Weightlifters at the 1978 Asian Games
Japanese male weightlifters
Medalists at the 1976 Summer Olympics
Asian Games gold medalists for Japan
Medalists at the 1974 Asian Games
Medalists at the 1978 Asian Games
20th-century Japanese people
21st-century Japanese people